

E

References

Lists of words